Giacomo Diego "Giandiego" Gatta (born 10 April 1964) is an Italian politician, member of the Chamber of Deputies from 2022.

Biography
Gatta was born in Manfredonia, province of Foggia, Apulia, Southern Italy.

References

1964 births
Living people
21st-century Italian politicians
Deputies of Legislature XIX of Italy
Forza Italia (2013) politicians